The following lists events that happened during 2016 in Laos.

Incumbents
Party General Secretary: Choummaly Sayasone (until 22 January), Bounnhang Vorachith (starting 22 January)
President: Choummaly Sayasone (until 20 April), Bounnhang Vorachith (starting 20 April)
Prime Minister: Thongsing Thammavong (until 20 April), Thongloun Sisoulith (starting 20 April)
Vice President: Bounnhang Vorachith (until 20 April), Phankham Viphavanh (starting 20 April)
National Assembly President: Pany Yathotou

Events
22 January–24 January - January 2016 East Asia Cold Wave
6 September–8 September - Eleventh East Asia Summit held in Vientiane
5 November - Beginning of the 2016 Mekong Club Championship

References

 
Years of the 21st century in Laos
Laos
2010s in Laos
Laos